The 2018 Cork Junior Hurling Championship was the 121st staging of the Cork Junior Hurling Championship since its establishment by the Cork County Board in 1895. The championship draw took place in August 2018. The championship began on 15 September 2018 and ended on 27 October 2018.

On 27 October 2018, Cloughduv won the championship after a 2-12 to 0-14 defeat of Russell Rovers in the final. This was their third title overall and their first title since 1970.

Qualification

The Cork Junior Hurling Championship features fourteen teams in the final tournament. Over 70 teams contested the seven divisional championships with the seven respective champions and runners-up automatically qualifying for the county series.

Results

Round 1

Quarter-finals

Semi-finals

Final

References

External links
 2018 Cork JAHC results 

Cork Junior Hurling Championship
Cork Junior Hurling Championship